Bloomingdale Township may refer to:
 Bloomingdale Township, DuPage County, Illinois
 Bloomingdale Township, Michigan

Township name disambiguation pages